Cynthia Turner (1932 – 1 February 2021) was a Maltese pianist. She was Malta's best known pianist and one of its most celebrated musicians. She played for Queen Elizabeth during a royal performance at the Manoel Theatre on 15 November 1967. She performed on stages, cable radio, radio and television in Malta, Italy, France, Germany and Egypt.

She received several awards. She became chevalier dans L'Order des Palmes Académiques and became an associate of the Royal Academy of Music in London.

In 1987 when the National Council of Women of Malta established the Bice Mizzi Vassallo Music Competition; Turner was a member of the organising committee and chaired the adjudicating panel for all editions of the contest.

She became a member of the National Order of Merit in 2004, one of the Maltese state's highest honours.

Personal life
Turner was born in Valletta in 1932. She went to the Convent of the Sacred Heart school. She was married to Anthony Caruana and they have two sons: Nicholas and Christopher. She had five grandchildren names Paul, Philip, James, Michael and Mischka.

Death 
Turner contracted COVID-19 during the COVID-19 pandemic in Malta while receiving treatment for a hip and wrist fracture. She died on 1 February 2021, at age 88.

References

1932 births
2021 deaths
Maltese pianists
Women pianists
Maltese women
People from Valletta
Deaths from the COVID-19 pandemic in Malta
Maltese women musicians